The flag of the Kherson Oblast is the official symbol of the Kherson Oblast of Ukraine, along with the coat of arms. Approved by the decision of the Kherson Regional Council No. 440 of 25 October 2001.

Description 
A rectangular panel with an aspect ratio of 2:3 is divided by three horizontal stripes - blue, white and blue - in a ratio of 1:2:1. On the white stripe near the pole is the coat of arms of the OblastУкраїна: герби та прапори / авт. проекту та упор.: В. Г. Кисляк, О. А. Нескоромний. — К.: Парламентське вид-во. 2010. — 456 с..Flag project authors: S. Sazonov and Y. Shepelev.

Criticism 
According to local history historian Oleksiy Patalakha, a full member of the Ukrainian Heraldic Society, the coat of arms and flag of the Kherson Oblast of 2001 are programmed for destruction, the symbolism of the coat of arms resembles the Masonic one (compass, two spikelets), and similarity to the Flag of Israel. Based on the coat of arms of 1919, the Ukrainian Heraldic Society proposed its flag project.A blue flag depicting a silver Orthodox six-pointed cross in golden radiance surrounded by three golden crowns. There is a golden border around the perimeter of the flag.

See also 

 Coat of arms of Kherson Oblast
 Flag of Kherson
 Flags used in Russian-controlled areas of Ukraine, for the flag used in areas of Kherson Oblast occupied by Russia
 The similar flags of Honduras, Israel and Nicaragua

References

External links 

 Official website of the Kherson Regional Council
 Ukrainian Heraldic Association
Kherson Oblast
Flags introduced in 2001